Nissim "Nisso" Kapiloto (born 1 October 1989) is an Israeli professional footballer who plays as a centre-back for Sektzia Ness Ziona.

Club career
Kapiloto made his Senior debut in a match against Hakoah Amidar Ramat Gan on 12 December 2006 when he was only 17 years old. He made his UEFA Cup debut against Kayseri Erciyesspor, still before his 18th birthday.

International career
On 7 September 2018, Kapiloto made his debut for the senior National team in a 1–0 loss against Albania.

Honours
Hapoel Haifa
Israel State Cup (1): 2017–18

References

External links
 

1989 births
Living people
Israeli footballers
Israeli Jews
Footballers from Bat Yam
Maccabi Tel Aviv F.C. players
F.C. Ashdod players
Hapoel Acre F.C. players
Alki Larnaca FC players
Beitar Jerusalem F.C. players
FC St. Gallen players
Hapoel Haifa F.C. players
Sektzia Ness Ziona F.C. players
Israeli Premier League players
Cypriot First Division players
Swiss Super League players
Israeli expatriate footballers
Expatriate footballers in Cyprus
Expatriate footballers in Switzerland
Israeli expatriate sportspeople in Cyprus
Israeli expatriate sportspeople in Switzerland
Israel under-21 international footballers
Israel international footballers
Association football central defenders